The Miss Universe Germany 2018 pageant was held on August 19, 2018 in the Dormero Hotel Bonn in Windhagen. The winner will represent Germany at Miss Universe 2018. The director of the pageant, Kim Kotter has set thirty-two franchise holders to be able to select candidates to represent states and regions of the country.

Final results

Official Delegates

External links
Official Website

2018 beauty pageants
2018 in Berlin
2018